Georg Karl Maria von Seidlitz (June 19, 1840, St. Petersburg – July 15, 1917, Irschenhausen near Munich) was a German doctor and entomologist. He was a zoology teacher in Dorpat (1868–77), then in Königsberg, (1877–88), where he became a fishery expert. He later specialised in Coleoptera, describing many new species and he wrote  Fauna Baltica. Die Käfer (Coleoptera) der Ostseeprovinzen Russlands. Dorpat, 1875. His general beetle collection is conserved in the Zoologische Staatssammlung München, his Baltic Coleoptera are in the zoology museum in Kaliningrad.

Von Seidlitz was an early supporter of Darwinism in continental Europe.

Selected publications

Die Darwin'sche Theorie: Elf Vorlesungen über die Entstehung der Thiere und Planzen durch Naturzüchtung (1871)

References

Klausnitzer, B. 2003: Der Beitrag österreichischer Entomologen zur Erforschung der Marienkäfer (Coleoptera, Coccinellidae). Denisia 8 91-120, 30 Abb. 92 
Scherer, G. 1992: Die Sektion Coleoptera der Zoologischen Staatssammlung München. Spixiana Suppl. 17 61-71, 5 Abb. 66 (Sammlung)

External links
 
History of Zoology in Königsberg

1840 births
1917 deaths
Baltic-German people
German entomologists
Scientists from Saint Petersburg
Academic staff of the University of Tartu
Academic staff of the University of Königsberg
Emigrants from the Russian Empire to Germany